Ablepharus darvazi is a species of skink, a lizard in the family Scincidae. The species is endemic to Asia.

Geographic range
Ablepharus darvazi is known only from the Darvaz mountains of Tajikistan. The species may live in Afghanistan, India, and Pakistan.

References

External links

Ablepharus
Reptiles described in 1990
Endemic fauna of Tajikistan
Taxa named by Alexander M. Panfilov